Cotylelobium is a genus of plants in the family Dipterocarpaceae. The name Cotylelobium is derived from Greek (kotyle = a small cup and lobos = a pod) and describes the receptacle. It contains five species distributed in Sri Lanka, Peninsular Thailand, Sumatra, Peninsular Malaysia and Borneo. All five species are listed on the IUCN redlist, as either vulnerable, endangered or critically endangered.

Species
, Plants of the World Online accepts the following species:
 Cotylelobium burckii 
 Cotylelobium lanceolatum 
 Cotylelobium lewisianum 
 Cotylelobium melanoxylon 
 Cotylelobium scabriusculum

References

Dipterocarpaceae
Malvales genera